Poiana Teiului is a commune in Neamț County, Western Moldavia, Romania. It is composed of eleven villages: Călugăreni, Dreptu, Galu, Petru Vodă, Pârâul Fagului, Poiana Largului, Poiana Teiului, Roșeni, Ruseni, Săvinești, and Topoliceni.

The village of Poiana Largului is located at the north end of Lake Bicaz, at the junction of several national roads (and ). It has a viaduct, erected over the last section of the lake.

The Petru Vodă Monastery can be reached from Poiana Largului by following a  dirt road. The tombs of father Gheorghe Calciu-Dumitreasa and poet Radu Gyr are located there.

References

Communes in Neamț County
Localities in Western Moldavia